My Teacher Is a Thug is a 25 episode Singaporean drama produced and telecast on Mediacorp Channel 8. The show aired at 9pm on weekdays and had a repeat telecast at 8am the following day. It is to commemorate Drama35 in Conjunction of Teacher's Day. It stars Li Nanxing & Bonnie Loo as the casts of the series..

Casts

Main Cast 

 Li Nanxing as Jia Tianxiong 贾天雄 Zong Zijie and He Zheshen 何哲鋠 as young Jia
 Bonnie Loo as Zeng Kaixin/Jia Kaixin 曾开心/贾开心

Supporting Casts

Original Sound Track (OST)

Production
 Filming began in April and wrapped in July 2017

See also
 List of programmes broadcast by Mediacorp Channel 8

References

Singaporean television series
2017 Singaporean television series debuts
2017 Singaporean television series endings
Singapore Chinese dramas
Channel 8 (Singapore) original programming